Monghsat or Mönghsat (also known as Mong Hsat) was small state of the Shan States in what is today Burma.

History
It was a small dependency of Kengtung State that had been a tract of land claimed by Mongnai State but annexed by Kengtung along with Mongpu further to the north. The capital and residence of the ruler was Monghsat town. 

Little is known about this state except that its forests had been overexploited at the turn of the 20th century during British Rule in Burma.

References

Shan States